Ivonne Leal (born February 27, 1966, in San Nicolas de Bari) is a retired javelin thrower from Cuba. She is best known for winning the gold medal in the women's javelin throw event at the 1985 Summer Universiade in Kobe, Japan.

Achievements

References

1966 births
Living people
Cuban female javelin throwers
Athletes (track and field) at the 1987 Pan American Games
Pan American Games medalists in athletics (track and field)
Pan American Games gold medalists for Cuba
World Athletics Championships athletes for Cuba
Universiade medalists in athletics (track and field)
Universiade gold medalists for Cuba
Medalists at the 1987 Pan American Games
Central American and Caribbean Games medalists in athletics
20th-century Cuban women